The Kerzhenets peat railway is located in Nizhny Novgorod Oblast, Russia. The railway operates year-round.

Current status 
The Kerzhenets peat railway emerged in the 1940s, in the area of Borsky District, Nizhny Novgorod Oblast. The peat railway was built for hauling peat and workers. The railway line leaves Kerzhenets at northern side to reach the peat fields. Until 1997 the settlement Pionersky at Kerzhenets River was the terminus of the railway. A peat briquette factory was established in 2002 and started its work in 2004.

Rolling stock

Locomotives

 TU8 – №0307
 ESU2A – №925

Railroad car

 Flatcar
 Tank car
 Snow blower
 Crane (railroad)
 Open wagon

Gallery

See also
Narrow-gauge railways in Russia
Altsevo peat railway
Narrow-gauge railway of Decor-1 factory

References and sources

External links

 Photos Kerzhenets
 Kerzhenets interactive map (English language)

750 mm gauge railways in Russia
Rail transport in Nizhny Novgorod Oblast